Richard Roy is a director, actor and screenwriter.

Richard Roy may also refer to:

Richard Roy (musician), former bassist in Canadian punk pop band Sum 41
Richard Roy (politician), Green Party of Canada candidate in 1993
Richard Roy (footballer) (born 1987), Trinidad and Tobago footballer